The Best of Ricky Martin is the second compilation album by the Puerto Rican singer Ricky Martin released by Columbia Records on October 30, 2001.

Commercial performance
The Best of Ricky Martin did not include any new material. The remixes of "Amor" were sent to radio stations in selected countries, to promote the album. The Best of Ricky Martin was not released in the United States.

The album peaked at number seven in Denmark, number twelve in the Netherlands and Italy, number seventeen in Finland, and number twenty-five in Australia. In the United Kingdom it reached number forty-two.

The Best of Ricky Martin was certified Platinum in Australia, and Gold in the United Kingdom and Finland. In the UK, the album has sold 177,064 copies.

Track listing

Charts

Weekly charts

Year-end charts

Certifications and sales

Release history

References

Ricky Martin compilation albums
2001 greatest hits albums